Wildfire is a 1915 silent drama film produced by the Shuberts and distributed by World Pictures. It is based on the 1908 Broadway play Wildfire by George V. Hobart and George Broadhurst. The play had starred the famous Lillian Russell, who, in a rare screen appearance, reprised her role here. It was remade in 1925 with Aileen Pringle. Surviving prints are missing the third reel and the ending. Prints and/or fragments were found in the Dawson Film Find in 1978.

According to the American Film Institute catalog, this film was shot at the Peerless Studios.

Plot 
John Keefe, a gambler, shoots and kills Robert Barrington in an argument over a card game. Keefe steals Barrington's papers and forges a bill of sale to himself for Barrington's stable of race horses back east. The stable includes the prize filly, Wildfire. Meanwhile, Barrington's daughters, Henrietta and Myrtle, are becoming worried about their father's long absence in the West. John Garrison, the sheriff of the town in which Barrington was killed, goes East to investigate. He suspects Keefe (now called John Duffy) and begins to build a case, causing Henrietta to become suspicious. Keefe, realizing that the game is almost up, tries to get Wildfire's jockey to throw the big race, but Henrietta saves the day and Wildfire wins.

Cast

 Lillian Russell - Henrietta Barrington
 Leone Morgan - Myrtle Barrington, her sister
 Richard Morris - Robert W. Barrington
 W. H. Powers - Ralph Woodhurst
 Lionel Barrymore - John Keefe, gambler
 Glenn White - Sheriff John Garrison
 Riley Hatch - Matt Donovan (as William Riley Hatch)
 George Mack - Bud
 Walter Kendig - Marty Green
 James J. Gorman - Gorman
 William C. Chamberlain - Walker
 Ruby Rose - Betty
 James Jeffrey - Chappy Raster

References

External links
 
 
 
 lobby card

1915 films
Silent American drama films
American silent feature films
American black-and-white films
American films based on plays
American horse racing films
Films about gambling
1915 drama films
World Film Company films
Films shot at Peerless Studios
Films directed by Edwin Middleton
1910s American films